Lower Frisco is a census-designated place in Catron County, New Mexico, United States. Its population was 31 as of the 2010 census. The community is part of San Francisco Plaza.

Geography

Demographics

Education
It is in the Reserve Independent School District.

References

Census-designated places in New Mexico
Census-designated places in Catron County, New Mexico